Aghbolagh-e Mokhur (also Romanized as Āghbolāgh-e Mokhūr; also known as Āqbolāgh) is a village in Qarah Quyun-e Jonubi Rural District, Qarah Quyun District, Showt County, West Azerbaijan Province, Iran. At the 2006 census, its population was 125, in 25 families.

References 

Tageo

Populated places in Showt County